The 2013–14 Serbian League East season was the eleventh season of the league under its current title.

External links
 Football Association of Serbia
 Football Association of East Serbia

Serbian League East seasons
3
Serbia